The Big Blue River is an  tributary of the Driftwood River in east-central Indiana in the United States.  Via the Driftwood, White, Wabash and Ohio rivers, it is part of the watershed of the Mississippi River.

Course
The Big Blue rises in northeastern Henry County and flows generally southwestwardly through Rush, Hancock, Shelby and Johnson counties, past the towns of New Castle, Knightstown, Carthage,  Morristown, Shelbyville and Edinburgh. At Shelbyville, it collects the Little Blue River.

At the USGS station at Shelbyville, Indiana, the Big Blue River has an approximate discharge of 513 cubic feet per second.

See also
List of Indiana rivers
County Line Bridge (Morristown, Indiana)

References

Columbia Gazetteer of North America entry
DeLorme (1998).  Indiana Atlas & Gazetteer.  Yarmouth, Maine: DeLorme.  .

Rivers of Indiana
Rivers of Hancock County, Indiana
Rivers of Henry County, Indiana
Rivers of Johnson County, Indiana
Rivers of Rush County, Indiana
Rivers of Shelby County, Indiana
Tributaries of the Wabash River